Taodue is an Italian film and television production company in MFE - MediaForEurope. It was founded by Pietro Valsecchi and Camilla Nesbitt in 1991.

Filmography

Films 
 La condanna (1991)
 La discesa di Aclà a Floristella (1992)
 Quattro bravi ragazzi (1992)
 La ribelle (1993)
 Un eroe borghese (1995)
 Testimone a rischio (1997)
 Il grande sogno (2009)
 Cado dalle nubi (2009)
 Che bella giornata (2011)
 I soliti idioti - Il film (2011)
 I due soliti idioti (2012)
 Sole a catinelle (2013)
 Amici come noi (2014)
 Chiamatemi Francesco (2015)
 Quo vado? (2016)

Television movies 
 La missione (1998)
 Il mio amico Babbo Natale (2005)
 Il mio amico Babbo Natale 2 (2006)

Television series 
 Distretto di polizia (2000–2011)
 Cuore contro cuore (2004)
 R.I.S. - Delitti imperfetti (2005–2009)
 R.I.S. Roma - Delitti imperfetti (2010–2012)
 Crimini bianchi (2008–2009)
 I liceali (2008–2011)
 Ho sposato una sirena (2008)
 Intelligence - Servizi & segreti (2009)
 Squadra antimafia - Palermo oggi (2009–present)
 La Scimmia (2012)
 Il tredicesimo apostolo (2012–2014)
 Benvenuti a tavola - Nord vs Sud (2012–2013)
 Il clan dei camorristi (2013)
 Le mani dentro la città (2014)
 Il bosco (2015)
 Squadra Mobile (2015–present)
 Romanzo siciliano (2016–present)

Television miniseries 
 Ultimo (1998)
 Ultimo - La sfida (1999)
 Uno bianca (2001)
 Francesco (St. Francis) (2001)
 Il testimone (2002)
 Il sequestro Soffiantini (2002)
 Ultima pallottola (2003)
 Doppio agguato (2003)
 Ultimo - L'infiltrato (2004)
 Paolo Borsellino (2005)
 Karol - Un uomo diventato papa (Karol: A Man Who Became Pope) (2005)
 Karol - Un papa rimasto uomo (Karol: The Pope, The Man) (2006)
 Attacco allo stato (2006)
 Nassiriya - Per non dimenticare (2007)
 Maria Montessori - Una vita per i bambini (2007)
 Il capo dei capi (2007)
 L'ultimo padrino (2008)
 Aldo Moro - Il presidente (2008)
 La scelta di Laura (2009)
 Ultimo 4 (2012)
 Il delitto di Via Poma (2012)

References

External links 
Official site

Film production companies of Italy
Television production companies of Italy
Italian companies established in 1991